Stegodibelodon is an extinct genus of elephant or gomphothere from the Miocene.

References

Miocene proboscideans
Prehistoric elephants
Prehistoric placental genera
Miocene mammals of Africa
Fossil taxa described in 1972